Seigo Nakao is the head of Japanese Studies at Oakland University in Rochester, Michigan, United States.  He is the author of many books relating to Japan including The Random House Japanese-English English-Japanese dictionary and the Japanese Reference Dictionary published by Berlitz, the Langenscheidt's Japanese dictionary : Japanese-English, English-Japanese, and several smaller dictionaries.  He is a translator of such classical Japanese works as Daidōji Yūzan's Code of the Samurai, and is a published literary critic with pieces available dealing with Akira Yoshimura, and others.

He was born in Nagasaki, received his Ph.D. from New York University, and first taught in America in New York City before coming to Oakland University where he now resides. He is also a fan of Yukio Mishima's work.

List of Literary Works
Berlitz Japanese-English English-Japanese Dictionary
Langenscheidt Pub Inc,  (2-8315-7124-3)
Daidoji Yuzan's Code of the Samurai:
A Contemporary Dual-Language Edition of the Bushido Shoshinshu
Seigo Nakao(translator)
Dirty Japanese: Everyday Slang from "What's Up?" to "F*%# Off!
by Seigo Nakao, Lindsay Mack (Illustrator)
Ulysses Pr,  (1-56975-565-5)
Langenscheidt's Pocket Japanese Dictionary: Japanese-English English-Japanese
by Seigo Nakao
Langenscheidt Pub Inc,  (0-88729-171-6)
Random House Japanese-English English-Japanese Dictionary
by Seigo Nakao
Ballantine Books,  (0-345-40548-X)
Random House Webster's Pocket Japanese Dictionary: Japanese, English, English, Japanese
by Seigo Nakao
Random House Inc,  (0-679-77373-8)
Random House Webster's Pocket Japanese Dictionary: Japanese-English English-Japanese
by Seigo Nakao
Random House Inc,  (0-375-72195-9)
Random House Japanese-English English-Japanese Dictionary
by Seigo Nakao
Random House Information Group,  (0-679-44149-2)

Essays
Akira Yoshimura. One Man's Justice.: An article from: World Literature Today
by Seigo Nakao
Snakelust.(Review): An article from: World Literature Today
by Seigo Nakao

References

External links
 Official Web page at Oakland.

Year of birth missing (living people)
Living people
Oakland University faculty
New York University alumni
Japanese emigrants to the United States
Japanese academics
Japanese Japanologists
Japanese–English translators